Carnot may refer to:

People
Carnot Posey (1818–1863), American lawyer and military officer

People with the surname
Lazare Carnot (1753-1823), French mathematician and politician  of the French Revolution
Louis Carnot (born 2001), French French footballer
Nicolas Léonard Sadi Carnot (1796-1832), French military scientist and physicist; son of Lazare Carnot
Hippolyte Carnot (1801-1888), French politician; son of Lazare Carnot
Marie François Sadi Carnot (1837-1894), French politician; President of France from 1887 to 1894 and son of Hippolyte Carnot
Marie-Adolphe Carnot (1839-1920), French mining engineer and chemist; son of Hippolyte Carnot
Paul Carnot (1869-1957), French physician; son of Marie-Adolphe Carnot
Stéphane Carnot (born 1972), former French footballer

Places 
Carnot, Central African Republic, a city
Carnot, Wisconsin, United States
Carnot-Moon, Pennsylvania, United States

Other uses
Carnot cycle, in thermodynamics
Carnot heat engine, an idealised thermodynamic engine based on the Carnot cycle
Carnot (crater), a crater on the far side of the moon
French battleship Carnot

See also
Carnot's theorem (disambiguation)
Carnotite, a mineral
Lycée Carnot, a school in Paris
Karnaugh